Benjamin Dahl Hagen (born 9 January 1988) is a Norwegian football defender who plays for Ski IL. He previously played for Fredrikstad and Vålerenga in Tippeligaen and Follo in Adeccoligaen.

Career
Hagen signed for Follo in 2006, and played in the Norwegian Cup final in 2010. The next year he was wanted by Vålerenga and played the club's friendly match against Liverpool on 1 August 2011. He later signed with Vålerenga, and played 10 matches in Tippeligaen before he was loaned out to Fredrikstad until 1 August 2012.

In 2014, he went from Follo to the amateur club Ski IL.

Career statistics

References

1988 births
Living people
People from Oppegård
Norwegian footballers
Follo FK players
Vålerenga Fotball players
Fredrikstad FK players
Eliteserien players
Norwegian First Division players
Association football defenders
Sportspeople from Viken (county)